István Kiss (born 28 October 1970 in Budapest) is a Hungarian football player who last played for FC Fehérvár.

References
 Futballévkönyv 1999, pp. 78–82, Aréna, Budapest, 2000 

1970 births
Living people
Hungarian footballers
Ferencvárosi TC footballers
III. Kerületi TUE footballers
Budapesti VSC footballers
Fehérvár FC players
Association football forwards
Footballers from Budapest